Dorneywood is an 18th-century house near Burnham in southern Buckinghamshire, England. Originally a Georgian farmhouse, it has Victorian and later additions, and following a fire in 1910, was remodelled in 1919 by Sir Robert Lorimer.

It was given to the National Trust by Lord Courtauld-Thomson in 1947 as a grace-and-favour country home for a senior member of the Government, usually a Secretary of State or Minister of the Crown.  The Dorneywood Trust has the objective of 'maintaining the mansion house and gardens of Dorneywood'.

Occupancy of the house
The Prime Minister alone has the right to decide which Minister or Secretary of State is to occupy the house. In previous administrations it has been the residence of the Chancellor of the Exchequer and, prior to 31 May 2006, was occupied by Deputy Prime Minister John Prescott. Prescott was forced to relinquish occupancy of Dorneywood, following a series of scandals over an affair with civil servant Tracey Temple and a snatched paparazzi photograph of him playing croquet on the lawn of the property whilst the Prime Minister Tony Blair was out of the country on a visit to Washington. However, given the controversies over John Prescott's use of the house, senior politicians were reluctant to use it. The house was eventually taken over by Alistair Darling, Chancellor of the Exchequer when Gordon Brown became Prime Minister in 2007. "A spokesman for Mr Brown ... explained that the house ... was owned by a trust, and would revert first to the Lord Mayor of London and then to the American Ambassador, if the Chancellor did not want it."

Various former Prime Ministers (before achieving the premiership) have occupied the house, among them Anthony Eden. On becoming Prime Minister, Alec Douglas-Home was reluctant to forsake the more comfortable and modern Dorneywood for the antique splendours of Chequers. Another, James Callaghan as Foreign Secretary, also had the use of Dorneywood (later Chevening was to become the official country home for the holder of that office).

In 2010, George Osborne, the Chancellor of the Exchequer, took occupancy of the house.  It was also used by Osborne's successors, Philip Hammond, Sajid Javid, and Rishi Sunak.

Interior

The interior of the house contains some decorations by Rex Whistler, as well as paintings and furniture belonging to the Government Art Collection. There is also furniture belonging to the National Trust. The house is only open to the public on selected dates.

Grounds
The National Trust markets the property under the name "Dorneywood Garden". The 1930s-style gardens are open to the public on selected dates during the summer. The grounds are noted for their cottage and kitchen garden, as well as their herbaceous borders and rose displays. The upkeep of the estate is in part supported by the Dorneywood Thomson Endowment Trust Fund.

See also
 Chequers, the British Prime Minister's official country retreat
 Chevening, the British Foreign Secretary's official country retreat
 List of official residences

References

External links
Dorneywood Garden information at the National Trust

Gardens in Buckinghamshire
Country houses in Buckinghamshire
National Trust properties in Buckinghamshire
Buildings of the Government of the United Kingdom
Official residences in the United Kingdom
Government buildings in England
Grade II listed houses in Buckinghamshire
18th-century establishments in England